Pieter Verhagen (26 August 1882 – 4 April 1950) was a Dutch architect. His work was part of the architecture event in the art competition at the 1924 Summer Olympics.

References

1882 births
1950 deaths
19th-century Dutch architects
20th-century Dutch architects
Olympic competitors in art competitions
People from Beverwijk